Joseph Addison (1672–1719) was an English politician and writer.

Joseph Addison may also refer to:

Joseph Addison (diplomat) (1879–1953), British ambassador
Joseph Edward Addison (1821–1890), British army officer